Frederick Norley (23 February 1845 – 1914) was an English professional cricketer who played for Kent County Cricket Club in seven first-class cricket matches between 1864 and 1865.

Norley was born at Canterbury in Kent in 1845, the son of James and Emma Norley. His father was a tailor and Norley grew up in the city. He is first known to have played cricket in 1863, appearing for Kent Colts sides that year and the next.

Debuting for the senior side as a professional bowler in 1864, he played in Kent's first six matches of the season, all of them losses. He bowled intermittently, but took a five-wicket haul against Surrey at Gravesend, the only one of his first-class career. He played in Kent's first match of the following season and was employed by the MCC at Lord's as a professional in 1865, playing one first-class match for the side as well as appearing in club games and umpiring matches.

In 1866 Norley was employed by the Clydeside Cricket Club at Glasgow and in 1868 by St George's Cricket Club in Manhattan, New York. He remained as a player and groundsman with St George's throughout the 1870s before moving to Canada during the 1880s. In 1884 he was employed as a coach and groundsman by Trinity College School at Port Hope, Ontario.

Norley married Clara Nesbitt at Newark, New Jersey, in 1869. The couple had two daughters. He died in Ontario in 1914. Norley's younger brother James played for Kent and Gloucestershire in the 1870s.

References

External links

1845 births
Date of death unknown
English cricketers
Kent cricketers
Marylebone Cricket Club cricketers